Hays is an English and Irish surname, a variant to the name Hayes. Notable people with the surname include:

 Alexander Hays (1819–1864), general in the Federal army during the American Civil War
 Anna Mae Hays (1920–2018), first woman in the U.S. Army to be promoted to general
 Arthur Garfield Hays (1881–1954), attorney for the American Civil Liberties Union
 Austin Hays (born 1995), American baseball player
 Brooks Hays (1898–1981), United States Congressman from Arkansas
 Butch Hays (born 1962), American-Australian basketball player
 Charles Melville Hays (1856–1912), American railroad executive who perished on the Titanic
 Dan Hays (born 1939), Canadian politician
Daniel P. Hays (1854–1923), American lawyer 
 David Hays (cricketer) (born 1944), English-born Scottish cricketer
 David G. Hays (1928–1995), linguist, computer scientist and social scientist
 Ethel Hays (1892–1989), American syndicated cartoonist
 George Price Hays (1892–1978), Lt. General, Commander of the 10th Mountain Division in the European Theater of Operations in World War II.
 George Washington Hays (1863–1927), governor of the state of Arkansas
 Harry Hays (1909–1982), Canadian Senator
 Harry T. Hays (1820–1876), general in the Confederate States Army during the American Civil War
 Irene Hays (born 1953/1954), British civil servant and businesswoman
 Isaac Hays (1796–1879), American ophthalmologist and naturalist
 John Coffee Hays (1817–1883), Texas Ranger and sheriff in the Old West
 Judith Salzedo Hays, married name of Judith Salzedo Peixotto (1823–1881), American teacher and principal
 Kathleen Hays, American economics reporter
 Kathryn Hays (born 1933), American actress
 Kevin Hays (born 1968), American jazz pianist
 Larry Hays, American college baseball coach
 Moses Judah Hays (1799–1861), Canadian businessman and municipal leader
 Paul Hays, Reading Clerk for the U.S. House of Representatives
 Richard B. Hays, American college professor at Duke University
 Robert Hays (born 1947), American actor
 Samuel Hays (disambiguation), several people
 Spencer Hays (born c. 1936), American businessman and art collector
 Todd Hays (born 1969), American Olympic bobsledder
 Wayne Hays (1911–1989), United States Congressman from Ohio
 William B. Hays (1844–1912), Mayor of Pittsburgh, Pennsylvania
 Will H. Hays (1879–1954), American politician and Postmaster General
 William Shakespeare Hays (1837–1907), American poet and lyricist

See also
Hayes (surname)

English-language surnames